Deborah Lynn Steinberg (7 October 1961 – 6 February 2017) was a British-based American academic, author, educator and sociologist. She was a Professor of Gender, Culture and Media Studies in the Department of Sociology at the University of Warwick.

Steinberg was born and brought up in Los Angeles, the daughter of Irwin Steinberg, a radiologist, and his wife, Maxine (née Beckerman) Steinberg, a lawyer. She had a BA in Women's Studies from the University of California, Berkeley; an MA from the University of Kent, and a PhD from the University of Birmingham.

She was diagnosed with breast cancer in 2007, but was given the all clear in 2013. However, the disease returned the following year. She continued to work until incapacitated by the disease, and died in 2017, aged 55. She was survived by her partner, Gershon Silins, her parents, and her brother, David.

Books
 
  .

References

External links
Steinberg, Deborah Lynn (c1970-2000), academic and sociologist, papers at the National Archives

1961 births
2017 deaths
University of California, Berkeley alumni
Alumni of the University of Kent
Alumni of the University of Birmingham
Academics of the University of Warwick
American expatriates in the United Kingdom
American sociologists
American women sociologists
British sociologists
Writers from Los Angeles
Place of death missing
Deaths from breast cancer
People associated with The Institute for Cultural Research
21st-century American women